Alpha Acosta is a Mexican actress.

Filmography

Awards and nominations

References

External links

Alpha Acosta at the Mexican Telenovela Database

1973 births
Living people
Mexican telenovela actresses
Mexican television actresses
Mexican film actresses
Actresses from Colima
20th-century Mexican actresses
21st-century Mexican actresses
People from Colima City